James Fortescue Harrison (1819 – 27 February 1905) was a Scottish Liberal Party politician.

Harrison was born in 1819. He was elected at the 1874 general election as the member of parliament (MP) for Kilmarnock Burghs, and held the seat until he stood down at the 1880 general election, and did not stand again.

He was the father of Lady Arthur Hill. Harrison died on 27 February 1905, at the age of 86.

References

External links

1819 births
1905 deaths
Members of the Parliament of the United Kingdom for Scottish constituencies
Scottish Liberal Party MPs
UK MPs 1874–1880